The 2019 Four Nations Tournament was the 18th edition of the Four Nations Tournament, an invitational women's football tournament held annually in China. The tournament used single-elimination instead of single round-robin system for the first time.

Teams

Venues

Matches
All times are local (UTC+08:00).

Bracket

Semi-finals

Third-place playoff

Final

Goalscorers

References

External links

2019 in women's association football
2019
2019 in Chinese football
January 2019 sports events in China
2019 in Nigerian sport